Jacksonville is a hamlet (and census-designated place) in Tompkins County, New York, United States. The community is located within the Town of Ulysses, along New York State Route 96. Jacksonville has a post office with ZIP code 14854, which opened on February 25, 1820.

References

Hamlets in Tompkins County, New York
Hamlets in New York (state)